The Youth of the Croatian Democratic Union, abbreviated to MHDZ, is the youth organisation of the Croatian Democratic Union.  To be a member, one has to be between 16 and 30 years old.  The MHDZ was founded on 13 September 1990.

International relations 
The MHDZ is member of the Youth of the European People's Party (YEPP), a European umbrella organisation of Christian democratic and conservative youth organisations of Europe, the Democrat Youth Community of Europe (DEMYC) and the international umbrella organisation International Young Democrat Union (IYDU).

Chairpersons 
 Mario Kapulica (1990–1998), MP 1995–1999
 Krunoslav Gašparić (1998–2001 & 19 days in 2002), MP 2000–2003
 Tonči Zoričić (2001–2002)
 Margareta Mađerić (2002–2007)
 Mislav Banek (2007–2011)
 Marina Banić (2011–2012)

External links 
 Youth of the Croatian Democratic Union official website

Croatian Democratic Union
International Young Democrat Union
Youth wings of political parties in Croatia